This list of climbs in cycle racing includes locations where stages of prominent races have taken place.

Andorra
 Arcalis (Tour de France and Vuelta a España)
 Port d'Envalira (Tour de France and Vuelta a España)

Austria

 Kitzbüheler Horn (Tour of Austria)

Belgium

 Berendries (Tour of Flanders)
 Bosberg (Tour of Flanders)
 Côte de La Redoute (Liège–Bastogne–Liège)
 Côte de Saint-Nicolas (Liège–Bastogne–Liège)
 Côte de Trieu (Tour of Flanders)
 Edelareberg
 Eikenberg
 Kanarieberg
 Kemmelberg
 Koppenberg
 Kortekeer
 Kruisberg
 Leberg
 Molenberg (Zwalm)
 Mur de Huy (La Flèche Wallonne)
 Muur van Geraardsbergen
 Oude Kwaremont
 Paterberg
 Steenbeekdries
 Taaienberg

France

 Col Agnel (Tour de France)
 Col d'Agnes (Tour de France)
 Col d'Allos (Tour de France)
 Alpe d'Huez (Tour de France)
 La Hourquette d'Ancizan (Tour de France)
 Col des Aravis (Tour de France)
 Col des Ares (Tour de France)
 Col d'Aspin (Tour de France)
 Col d'Aubisque (Tour de France)
 Ax 3 Domaines (Tour de France)
 Port de Balès
 Col du Ballon d'Alsace
 Plateau de Beille
 Little St Bernard Pass
 Col du Berthiand
 Col de la Bonette
 Col du Bonhomme
 Mont Cenis
 Chamrousse
 Col des Chevrères
 Col de la Colombière
 Col de la Core
 Courchevel
 Col de la Croix de Fer
 Col de la Croix de Mounis
 Col de la Croix Fry
 Col de la Croix-Morand
 Les Deux Alpes
 Mont Donon
 Col d'Entremont
 Col d'Èze (Paris–Nice)
 Col de la Faucille
 Col de Font-de-Cère
 Col du Galibier
 Col du Glandon
 Gourette
 Col du Grand Ballon
 Col du Grand Colombier
 Col du Grand Cucheron
 Col du Granier
 Col du Granon
 Guzet-Neige
 Hautacam
 Col de l'Iseran
 Col d'Izoard
 Col de Jambaz
 Col de Joux Plane
 La Planche des Belles Filles
 Port de Larrau
 Col de Latrape
 Col du Lautaret
 Le Markstein
 Port de Lers
 Col de la Lombarde
 Luz Ardiden
 Col de Macuègne
 Col de la Madeleine
 Col de Manse
 Col de Menté
 La Mongie
 Mont Cassel
 Col de Montgenèvre
 Mûr-de-Bretagne
 Col du Noyer
 Col d'Ornon
 Port de Pailhères
 Col de Palaquit
 Mur de Péguère
 Col du Perthus (Massif Central)
 Col du Petit Ballon
 Peyragudes
 Col de Peyresourde
 Pas de Peyrol
 Pla d'Adet
 La Plagne
 Col du Platzerwasel
 Col de Port
 Col de Porte
 Col de Portel
 Col de Portet
 Col de Portet d'Aspet
 Col du Portillon
 Pra-Loup
 Col du Pré
 Puy de Dôme
 Col de la Ramaz
 Rampe de Laffrey
 Col de la République
 Mont Revard
 Risoul
 Cormet de Roselend
 La Rosière, Savoie
 Col des Saisies
 Col de Sarenne
 Col de la Schlucht
 Semnoz
 Col du Soulor
 Super Besse
 Superbagnères
 Les Sybelles
 Col du Télégraphe
 Col du Tourmalet
 Col de Val Louron-Azet

India

 Kalhatty (Tour of Nilgiris)

Italy

 Col Agnel
 Tesero (Giro d'Italia)

 Little St Bernard Pass (Tour de France)
 Breuil-Cervinia
 Campitello Matese
 Cipressa (Milan–San Remo)
 Nivolet Pass
 Colle Fauniera
 Colle Sestriere
 Monte Crostis
 Mount Etna (Giro d'Italia)
 Passo Fedaia
 Colle delle Finestre (Giro d'Italia)
 Furkelpass
 Gavia Pass (Giro d'Italia)
 Giau Pass (Giro d'Italia)
 Piancavallo
 Gran Sasso d'Italia
 Monte Grappa 
 Kronplatz
 Col de la Lombarde
 Sanctuary of the Madonna di San Luca (Giro dell'Emilia)
 Lysjoch
 Madonna del Ghisallo (Il Lombardia)
 Madonna di Campiglio
 Maiella (includes the Blockhaus climb)
 Mauria Pass
 Monte Cassino
 Monte Terminillo
 Montecampione
 Montevergine
 Mortirolo Pass (Giro d'Italia)
 Muro di Sormano (Il Lombardia)
 Sanctuary of Oropa
 Poggio di San Remo (Milan–San Remo)
 Pordoi Pass
 Prati di Tivo
 Prato Nevoso
 Roccaraso
 Colle di Sampeyre
 San Fermo della Battaglia
 San Marco Pass
 Seiser Alm
 Sella Pass
 Sestriere
 Stelvio Pass (Giro d'Italia)
 Superga (Milano–Torino)
 Tonale Pass
 Tre Cime di Lavaredo
 Passo del Turchino
 Umbrail Pass
 Vajolet Towers
 Vivione Pass
 Monte Zoncolan (Giro d'Italia)

Netherlands

 Cauberg (Amstel Gold Race)
 Eyserbosweg (Amstel Gold Race)
 Keutenberg (Amstel Gold Race)
 Vaalserberg (Amstel Gold Race)

Spain

 Aitana (Vuelta a España)
 Alto Campoo (Vuelta a España)
 Alto de l'Angliru (Vuelta a España)

 Formigal Ski Resort
 Jaizkibel
 La Camperona
 La Covatilla
 Jaizkibel (Clásica de San Sebastián)
 La Molina (ski resort)
 La Pandera
 Lakes of Covadonga
 Port de Larrau
 Las Praderas, Nava
 Los Machucos
 Mirador de Ézaro
 Montjuïc (Volta a Catalunya)
 Monte Naranco
 Port Ainé
 Port del Cantó
 Col du Portillon
 Sierra de Cazorla
 Sierra Nevada Ski Station
 Valdelinares
 Vallter 2000 (Volta a Catalunya)

Switzerland

 Albula Pass
 Champex Pass
 Col de la Croix
 Col des Mosses
 Col des Planches
 Crans-Montana
 Flüela Pass
 Furka Pass
 Gotthard Pass
 Grimsel Pass
 Klausen Pass
 Lukmanier Pass
 Monte Ceneri
 Nufenen Pass
 Samnaun
 Sanetsch Pass
 Susten Pass
 Verbier
 Vercorin
 Wildhaus Pass

United Kingdom

 Bear Road, Brighton
 Box Hill, Surrey
 Buttertubs Pass

 Caerphilly mountain (Tour of Britain)
 Cat and Fiddle Road
 Ditchling Beacon
 Elm Grove, Brighton
 Farthing Common
 Gun (Staffordshire)
 Haytor
 Holme Moss
 Honister Pass
 Kirkstone Pass
 Leith Hill
 Oliver's Mount
 Rosedale Chimney Bank
 Sutton Bank
 The Tumble
 Whinlatter Pass

United States

 Brasstown Bald (Tour de Georgia)

 Mount Diablo
 Mount Evans
 Independence Pass (Colorado)
 Lookout Mountain (Colorado)
 Monarch Pass
 Monarch Ski Area
 Morgul-Bismark
 Mount Crested Butte, Colorado
 Mountain High
 Mount San Antonio
 Snowbird, Utah
 Mount Washington (New Hampshire)

References

Climbs in cycle racing
climb